João Chingando Manha (born 16 May 1994), commonly known as Kaporal, or Caporal, is an Angolan footballer who currently plays as a forward for Interclube.

Career statistics

Club

Notes

International

International goals
Scores and results list Angola's goal tally first.

References

External links
 

1994 births
Living people
Angolan footballers
Angola international footballers
Association football forwards
Estrela Clube Primeiro de Maio players
G.D. Interclube players
People from Benguela
Angola A' international footballers
2018 African Nations Championship players